Elections for the Pennsylvania House of Representatives were held on November 7, 2000, with all districts being contested. State Representatives are elected for two-year terms, with the entire House of Representatives up for a vote every two years. The term of office for those elected in 2000 ran from January 3, 2001 until November 30, 2002. Necessary primary elections were held on April 4, 2000.

Notable elections

Retirements
Republican Todd Platts was elected to represent Pennsylvania's 19th congressional district, allowing fellow Republican Beverly D. Mackereth to take his seat in the 119th legislative district.

In the 54th legislative district, Terry Van Horne was succeeded by fellow Democrat John Pallone. Van Horne was an unsuccessful candidate for Congress, losing to Republican Pennsylvania State Senator Melissa Hart in the election for Pennsylvania's 4th congressional district.

In the 37th legislative district, Republican Katie True left her seat to run as the Republican nominee for Pennsylvania Auditor General, eventually losing the election to Democrat Bob Casey, Jr. Her fellow Republican, Thomas C. Creighton, succeeded her. True would eventually return to the House in the newly redistricted 41st legislative district in the 2002 election.

Democratic primary upsets in Philadelphia
In the 180th legislative district, Democratic incumbent Benjamin Ramos was defeated by Angel Cruz, who went on to easily win the general election. In the 197th legislative district, Democratic incumbent Andrew J. Carn was defeated by Jewell Williams, who also went on to easily win the general election.

60th legislative district
In the 60th legislative district, incumbent Tim Pesci was defeated for re-election by 25-year-old Republican Jeff Coleman, in spite of the district being 70% Democratic. Bill DeWeese, the House Democratic Leader, said that Pesci had run a "condescending" race against Coleman, calling his opponent "Jeffy" and describing Coleman's campaign volunteers as "the Children from the Corn," referring to the horror film.

189th legislative district
In the 189th legislative district, Democratic incumbent Joseph W. Battisto was defeated by Republican Kelly Lewis. Battisto attempted a comeback in a 2002 special election for the 176th legislative district, but lost to Mario Scavello.

General election

References

Sources
 
 
 

House of Representatives
2000
Pennsylvania House of Representatives